Kritika (Hungarian: Critique) is a monthly political, cultural and literary magazine published in Budapest, Hungary. It has been in circulation since 1972.

History and profile
Kritika was launched in 1972. It is published on a monthly basis by Népszabadság Zrt. which also publishes a left-liberal daily, Népszabadság.

The magazine, headquartered in Budapest, describes itself as a "socio-theoretical and cultural publication". It covers essays on literary, theatre and film analyses, and interviews. In addition, it publishes articles about political and cultural analyses. As of 2013 Erno Balogh was the editor of the monthly.

See also
 List of magazines in Hungary

References

External links

1972 establishments in Hungary
Cultural magazines
Hungarian-language magazines
Literary magazines published in Hungary
Political magazines published in Hungary
Magazines established in 1972
Magazines published in Budapest
Monthly magazines